Behesht-e Sakineh is a major cemetery located in Iran near the city of Karaj. It is established in 1976.

Notable burials
 Abolfazl Zanjani (fa) (1899–1992) – politician
 Mohammad Zohari (1926–1995) – writer
 Mahmoud Etemadzadeh (1915–2006) – writer
 Bahman Safvat (fa) (1940–2006) – journalist
 Amir-Hossein Heshmat-Saran (1960–2009) – political activist
 Shapour Yasemi (fa) (1922–2011) – film  director
 Massoumeh Seyhoun (1934–2010) – painter
 Mohsen Pezeshkpour (1928–2011) – leader of Pan-Iranist Party
 Fahimeh Rastkar (1934–2012) – actress
 Iraj Ghaderi (1934–2012) – actor
 Behrouz Servatian (1937–2012) – scholar
 Asghar Elahi (fa) (1944–2012) – writer
 Dariush Safvat (1928–2013) – musician
 Mohsen Amiraslani (1977–2014) – psychoanalyst
 Rahim Moeini Kermanshahi (1923–2015) – poet
 Beitollah Abbaspour (fa) (1980–2015) – athletic
 Cyrus Qahramani (fa) (1938–2017) – actor
 Ali-Ashraf Darvishian (1941–2017) – scholar
 Sima Hajikhani (Negar) (fa) (1955–2018) – actress
 Amir-Hossein Kabiri (fa) (1987–2019) – protester
 Ebrahim Ketabdar (fa) (1990–2019) – protester
 Pouya Bakhtiari (1992–2019) – protester
 Meysam Ahmadi (fa) (1992–2019) – protester
 Azadeh Zarbi (fa) (1993–2019) – protester
 Najaf Daryabandari (fa) (1929–2020) – writer
 Nader Mokhtari (fa) (1985–2020) – protester
 Ebrahim Qanbari-Mehr (1928–2022) – musician
 Manouchehr Esmaeili (1939–2022) – sound actor
 Karim Bavi (1964–2022) – football player
 Hadis Najafi (fa)  (2000–2022) – protester
 Sarina Esmailzadeh (fa)  (2006–2022) – protester

References

Cemeteries in Iran